Richard Vryling LeSueur (28 January 1879 – 6 September 1945) was a Conservative member of the House of Commons of Canada. He was born in Sarnia, Ontario and became a barrister.

He was elected to Parliament at the Lambton West riding in the 1921 general election. After serving his only federal term, the 14th Canadian Parliament, LeSueur was defeated in the 1925 election by William Goodison of the Liberals.

External links
 

1879 births
1945 deaths
Conservative Party of Canada (1867–1942) MPs
Lawyers in Ontario
Members of the House of Commons of Canada from Ontario
People from Sarnia